Frans Arvo Ilmari Pohjannoro (18 November 1893, in Tampere – 10 October 1963; surname until 1906 Floor) was a Finnish Lutheran clergyman and politician. He was a member of the Parliament of Finland from 1936 to 1948, representing the National Coalition Party. In 1918, he served in the Finnish Civil War on the White side as the military chaplain of the 2nd Grenadier Regiment.

References

1893 births
1963 deaths
Politicians from Tampere
People from Häme Province (Grand Duchy of Finland)
20th-century Finnish Lutheran clergy
National Coalition Party politicians
Members of the Parliament of Finland (1936–39)
Members of the Parliament of Finland (1939–45)
Members of the Parliament of Finland (1945–48)
People of the Finnish Civil War (White side)
Finnish people of World War II
University of Helsinki alumni